Brian Douglas Kerns (born May 22, 1957) is an American politician. He served as a Republican Representative from Indiana's 7th Congressional District from January 3, 2001 to January 3, 2003.

Kerns was  born in Terre Haute, Indiana. He has both a B.A. and an M.P.A. from Indiana State University. He is the son-in-law of Representative John T. Myers. He is married and has five children.

Prior to serving in Congress, Kerns was an administrator at St. Joseph's College, and a television journalist. Kerns also was an aide to Representative Edward A. Pease and served as his chief of staff.

Congressional career
In 2000, when Pease retired, Kerns won a 12-way Republican Primary. Kerns went on to win the general election with close to 65% of the vote.

During his term in Congress, Kerns took up many social issues including gun rights and working to ban human cloning. He is also responsible for bringing closure to the Lafayette Railroad Relocation Project.  Kerns served on the International Relations and Transportation and Infrastructure Committees. During his time in congress, Kerns never missed a single vote.

After the 2000 United States Census, Kerns' district, which stretched from Terre Haute to West Lafayette, was eliminated. Most of Kerns' old territory was placed in the newly created . That district had previously been the 5th, represented by fellow Republican Steve Buyer. However, Kerns' home in Terre Haute was placed in the Evansville-based 8th District of another Republican, John Hostettler. Rather than challenge Hostettler for the Republican nomination in the 8th, Kerns moved to Hendricks County to face Buyer and lost.

References

External links

 

1957 births
Living people
Indiana State University alumni
Politicians from Terre Haute, Indiana
Journalists from Indiana
American male journalists
Saint Joseph's College (Indiana)
Political chiefs of staff
United States congressional aides
21st-century American politicians
Republican Party members of the United States House of Representatives from Indiana